Avaí Futebol Clube is a Brazilian football team from Florianópolis in Santa Catarina, founded on 1 September 1923. Their home stadium is Estádio Aderbal Ramos da Silva, also known as Ressacada, with a capacity of 17,800. They play in blue and white shirts, shorts and socks.

History
The club was founded after a businessman called Amadeu Horn gave football kits to a group of boys. The boys played a match against a team called Humaitá, and won. On 1 September 1923, at Amadeu Horn's house, the club was founded, known as Avahy Football Club at the time. The team was named Avahy after the Battle of Avay, in the Paraguayan War. In the following year, it became the first Santa Catarina State Championship champion.

Avaí has played in the Brazilian First Division ("Série A") eleven times: 1974, 1976, 1977, 1979, 2009, 2010, 2011, 2015, 2017, 2019 and 2022. In 1998, they won their only national title, the Brazilian Third Division ("Série C"). From 1999 to 2008 and from 2012 to 2014, they played in the Série B with their best campaigns being the third place attained in 2004 (when Avaí reached the Final Four, but could not be promoted to the First Division because only the two best placed teams were promoted) and 2008.

In 2008 they finished 3rd in the championship and were promoted to the First Division for the first time in 30 years. In its first year playing in Série A, Avaí finished in 6th place, thus qualifying for the Copa Sudamericana. This has been the best participation ever by a club from the State of Santa Catarina in the Brazilian first division. The team eventually was relegated in 2011, and returned to the Série A in 2014, when the team won the promotion in the last round. Avaí won the most Santa Catarina State Championship titles in the 20th Century (13), and is currently the all-time record state champions (18), same as cross-bridge rivals Figueirense.

Rivals
Avaí's greatest rival is Figueirense.

Club colors and nickname
The club colors are blue and white, and it is known as "The Lion of the Island" (because 90% of the Florianópolis territory is established on an island).

Competitions record

Série A

Série B

Série C

Copa do Brasil

Copa Sudamericana

 9 seasons in Série A
 19 seasons in Série B
 5 seasons in Série C

Stadium

Avaí's stadium is Estádio Aderbal Ramos da Silva (though it's mostly referred to as Ressacada), and it was inaugurated in 1983. It has a maximum capacity of 17,800 people, but its record crowd was 32,000 at the 1988 State Championship final. Before 1983, Avaí's stadium was Estádio Adolfo Konder (which has been subsequently demolished).

Players

First team squad

Reserve team

Out on loan

Technical staff

Honours
 Campeonato Brasileiro Série C
Winners (1): 1998
 Campeonato Catarinense
Winners (18): 1924, 1926, 1927, 1928, 1930, 1942, 1943, 1944, 1945, 1973, 1975, 1988, 1997, 2009, 2010, 2012, 2019, 2021
 Copa Santa Catarina
Winners (1): 1995
 Campeonato Catarinense Série BWinners (1):''' 1994

Affiliated clubs
The following club is currently affiliated with Avaí FC:

  Odisha FC (2021–present)

References

External links

Official website
Fan site
Terra Esportes – Avaí
FutebolSC.com – Avaí
Fanáticos por Futebol – Avaí
AvaianoSempre – Avaí's Flog

 
Association football clubs established in 1923
Sport in Florianópolis
1923 establishments in Brazil